Léa Buet (born 20 March 1989 in Léhon) is a French-born naturalized Senegalese judoka who competed in the women's 57 kg class.

Career

France
Buet started playing judo at a young age at Dinan. She played at the Anne-de-Bretagne college in Rennes, then for clubs at Poitiers and Bordeaux.
She then joins the club of Sainte Geneviève Sports club in Paris and wins the bronze medal at the French junior championships in 2007 in 52 kg category.

Senegal
She stopped competing in France by 2009 and later emigrated to Senegal in 2012, eventually becoming a naturalized Senegalese citizen in 2015. She played her first competition under the Senegal at the 2015 African Judo Championships. She won the bronze medal in for the 57 kg category at the 2015 African Games at Brazzaville.

Post retirement after 2017, Buet founded the sports association Adjimé which promotes and organises MMA events in Senegal.

References

External links
 

1989 births
Living people
Sportspeople from Côtes-d'Armor
French emigrants to Senegal
Senegalese people of French descent
Naturalized citizens of Senegal
French female judoka
Senegalese female judoka
African Games medalists in judo
African Games bronze medalists for Senegal
Competitors at the 2015 African Games